Towaninny South is a locality in the local government area of the Shire of Buloke Victoria, Australia.
The pastoral run here was known as Towaninnie, but when the area was surveyed and gazetted as a parish in 1871 the spelling was Towaninny.

See also
List of places in Victoria (Australia) named from pastoral runs

References

Towns in Victoria (Australia)